Xadani Zapotec (Eastern Pochutla Zapotec) is a Zapotec language spoken in southern Oaxaca, Mexico.

References

Zapotec languages